The following lists events that happened during 1918 in Armenia.

Incumbents
Prime Minister: Hovhannes Katchaznouni
Speaker of the Parliament: Avetik Sahakyan

Events

March
? - The Armenian–Azerbaijani War begins.

May
 May 21–29 - The Ottoman World War I defeat at the Battle of Sardarabad is seen as saving the Armenian nation from destruction.
 May 25–28 - Outnumbered Armenian defenders defeat invading Ottoman forces in the Battle of Karakilisa.
 May 28 - Armenia declares its independence as the First Republic of Armenia.

June
 June 4 - The First Republic of Armenia signs its first treaty, the Treaty of Batum. The other signatories are the Ottoman Empire, the Azerbaijan Democratic Republic and the Democratic Republic of Georgia.

December
 December 1–31 - The Georgian–Armenian War is fought.
 December 18 - Armenpress, the oldest news agency in Armenia, is founded.

Births
 September 30 - Gevorg Emin, poet, essayist and translator

Deaths
 ? - Hambardzum Arakelian, journalist, writer and activist, founder of The Relief Committee for Armenian migrants and the Armenian Popular party

References

 
1910s in Armenia
Years of the 20th century in Armenia
Armenia
Armenia
Armenia